The 1909–10 season was the 39th season of competitive football in England.

Events
Aston Villa won their sixth top division title.

Lincoln City were re-admitted to the Football League after a season away, at the expense of Chesterfield.

Honours

Notes = Number in parentheses is the times that club has won that honour. * indicates new record for competition

League tables

First Division

Second Division

References